Rudolf Hermann was a Czechoslovakian luger who competed during the 1930s. He won three medals at the European luge championships with one silver (Men's doubles: 1934) and two bronzes (Men's singles: 1938, Men's doubles: 1939).

References
List of European luge champions 

Czechoslovak male lugers
Year of birth missing
Year of death missing